Allium obliquum, common name lop-sided onion or twisted-leaf onion, is a Eurasian species of wild onion with a range extending from Romania to Mongolia. It is also widely cultivated elsewhere as an ornamental.

Allium obliquum produces an egg-shaped bulb up to 3 cm long. Scape is up to 100 cm tall, round in cross-section. Leaves are flat, shorter than the scape, up to 20 mm across. Umbels are spherical, with many yellow flowers crowded together.

References

External links
 

obliquum
Onions
Flora of Eastern Europe
Flora of temperate Asia
Plants described in 1753
Taxa named by Carl Linnaeus